The genus Systropha comprises several species of Old World sweat bees, primarily specialist pollinators of plants in the genus Convolvulus. Males of the genus have unusual curled antennae, and females have pollen-carrying hairs covering almost the entire abdomen.

Distribution
Systropha species occur from Spain and Morocco east to Tajikistan, and north as far as southern Germany. They occur in both eastern and western parts of Africa, south to Namibia. Asian species range as far south as Sri Lanka and Thailand.

Life history
So far as is known, all species are oligolectic on flowers of Convolvulus, with unusual modifications of the scopa, such that almost the entire abdomen (including the dorsal surface) is used for carrying pollen, rather than the legs, as in most bees. Pollen is carried to nests in the ground, formed into pollen masses, on each of which a single egg is laid before the cell containing the pollen is sealed, and another cell is then constructed and provisioned.

Species
Species according to Catalogue of Life:

References

External links

Halictidae
Bee genera
Hymenoptera of Africa
Hymenoptera of Asia
Hymenoptera of Europe